Chlorochroa rossiana is a species of stink bug in the family Pentatomidae. It is found in North America.

References

External links

 

Articles created by Qbugbot
Insects described in 1983
Pentatomini